Pandanus spiralis is native to northern Australia. It is commonly called common screwpine, iidool, pandanus palm,  screw pine, screw palm or spring pandanus. It is neither a true palm, nor a pine.

Distribution 

Pandanus spiralis occurs in Queensland, Northern NSW, the Northern Territory and the extreme north of Western Australia.

The plant is most commonly found growing along watercourses or coastal fringes and dune systems.

Description 

Pandanus spiralis is a shrub or small tree up to 10 metres in height. It has long, spiny leaves organised in a spiral arrangement. The plant bears a large, pineapple-like cluster of fruit that turn orange-red when ripe.

Wildlife including birds take advantage of the spiny leaves by living in the tree for protection. They also favor its fruit.

Uses 

The leaves of P. spiralis can be used to weave neckbands and armbands. The fibre of the leaves can be used as string for dillybags. Other uses include baskets, mats, and shelters. In addition, mashed leaves can be used to cure headaches when tied around the head. The Burarra people use the plant to make fish traps.

The fruit's seeds can also be ground to make flour.

Gallery

References

spiralis
Flora of Queensland
Flora of the Northern Territory
Angiosperms of Western Australia
Monocots of Australia
Drought-tolerant trees
Trees of Australia